Wayne Township is the name of sixteen townships in Indiana:

 Wayne Township, Allen County, Indiana
 Wayne Township, Bartholomew County, Indiana
 Wayne Township, Fulton County, Indiana
 Wayne Township, Hamilton County, Indiana
 Wayne Township, Henry County, Indiana
 Wayne Township, Huntington County, Indiana
 Wayne Township, Jay County, Indiana
 Wayne Township, Kosciusko County, Indiana
 Wayne Township, Marion County, Indiana
 Wayne Township, Montgomery County, Indiana
 Wayne Township, Noble County, Indiana
 Wayne Township, Owen County, Indiana
 Wayne Township, Randolph County, Indiana
 Wayne Township, Starke County, Indiana
 Wayne Township, Tippecanoe County, Indiana
 Wayne Township, Wayne County, Indiana

See also
Wayne Township (disambiguation)

Indiana township disambiguation pages